Win Win Myint, who uses the pen name Ma Kyee Tan (Loikaw), is a Burmese writer and poet. 
As of 2005 she had written six books.
Many of her poems, short stories and articles had received publication in magazines.

Awards

In June 2003, Win Win Myint won a third prize for short stories in the International Day Against Drug Abuse and Illicit Trafficking competition, and a consolation prize for poetry.

In December 2004, she was awarded third prize in the selected poem genre of the Sarpay Beikman Manuscript Award for 2003.

In 2005, she won an award at the annual Dr Tin Shwe awards for her book Pwint Ye Yin Khon Than (The Heartbeat of a Flower).
This is a biography of May Shin, the veteran actress and singer.

References

Burmese women poets
Year of birth missing (living people)
Living people
21st-century Burmese poets
21st-century Burmese women writers
21st-century Burmese writers